The Downs Station also known as the Commander-in-Chief, the Downs or
Admiral Commanding at the Downs was a formation of the Kingdom of Great Britain and then the United Kingdom's Royal Navy based at Deal. It was a major command of the Royal Navy from 1626 until 1834.

The Downs is a roadstead (area of sheltered, favourable sea) in the southern North Sea near the English Channel off the east Kent coast. It is primarily known in naval history for the Dutch defeat of the Spanish in the Battle of the Downs in 1639.

History
The Downs served as permanent base for naval vessels operating out of Deal, Kent.

It served as a base for warships patrolling the North Sea. The command generally covered an area in the southern North Sea near the English Channel off the east Kent coast. The station lasted until 1815, when it was absorbed into the Commander-in-Chief, The Nore's control, whose role and geographic area of responsibility was re-defined by the Admiralty.

Commanders in chief 
Incomplete list includes:
 = died in post
 Commodore Sir Henry Palmer, 1626
 Rear-Admiral Sir John Penington, 1626–1631
 Vice-Admiral Sir John Penington, 1638–1645
 Vice-Admiral Sir John Mennes, 1645–1649
 Rear-Admiral Richard Badiley, 1649–1650
 Vice-Admiral John Lawson, 1650–1656
 Vice-Admiral Richard Badiley, 1656 
 Admiral Sir Edward Montagu, 1657–1663
 Commodore Thomas Allin, 1663–1664
 Admiral Sir William Penn, 1664–1666
 Vice-Admiral Sir John Holmes, 1667–1679
 Commodore Stafford Fairborne, 1695–1697 
 Rear-Admiral Basil Beaumont, 1699–1703 
 Commodore Richard Griffith, 1707
 Commodore Gerard Ellwes, 1707–1708 
 Commodore Charles Cornwall, 1709–1710
 Commodore Tudor Trevor, 1711–1712
 Rear-Admiral Sir Charles Wager, 1712–1714
 Captain Edward Vernon, 1716
 Commodore Philip Cavendish, 1716
 Admiral Edward Vernon, 1745
 Vice-Admiral William Martin, 1745
 Commodore Matthew Michell, 1745–1748
 Admiral Thomas Smith, 1755–1758
 Commodore Sir Peircy Brett, 1758–1761
 Commodore John Moore, 1761–1766
 Rear-Admiral John Montagu, 1771
 Commodore John Elliot, 1777–1778
 Vice-Admiral Matthew Buckle, 1778–1779
 Vice-Admiral Francis William Drake, 1779–1782
 Rear-Admiral John Evans, 1780–1781*
 Rear-Admiral Sir Richard Hughes, 1781–1782*
Station not active 1782 to 1790 
 Rear-Admiral Sir Richard King, 1790–1791
Station not active 1791 to 1793
 Rear-Admiral John MacBride, 1793–1794    
 Vice-Admiral Joseph Peyton, 1794–1799
 Rear-Admiral John Bazely, 1796–1797*
 Vice-Admiral Skeffington Lutwidge, 1799–1802 
 Rear-Admiral Edward Thornbrough, 1803 
 Vice-Admiral Philip Patton, 1803–1804
 Vice-Admiral John Holloway, 1804–1807 
 Vice-Admiral Bartholomew Rowley, 1807–1808 
 Vice-Admiral George Campbell, 1808–1811
 Vice-Admiral Sir Thomas Foley, 1811–1815 
 Rear-Admiral William Hall Gage, 1833
Temporary command in absence of senior officer *

Notes

References 
 
 Ireland, Bernard (2001), Naval Warfare in the Age of Sail - War at Sea 1756–1815, 1st Ed, WW Norton & Co. .
 Marshall, John (18 November 2010). Royal Naval Biography: Or, Memoirs of the Services of All the Flag-Officers, Superannuated Rear-Admirals, Retired-Captains, Post-Captains, and Commanders. Cambridge University Press. 
 Rodger, N.A.M. (2004), The Command of the Ocean: A Naval History of Britain, 1649–1815. New York and London: W.W. Norton and Company. .
 

Commands of the Royal Navy
Military units and formations established in 1777
Military units and formations disestablished in 1815